In Greek mythology, Philotes was a minor goddess or spirit (daimones) personifying affection, friendship, and sexual intercourse.

Family 
Philotes  was a daughter of the primordial deities Erebus (Darkness) and Nyx (Night).

Hesiod's account 
And Nyx (Night) bore hateful Moros (Doom) and black Ker (Violent Death) and Thanatos (Death), and she bore Hypnos (Sleep) and the tribe of Oneiroi (Dreams). And again the goddess murky Night, though she lay with none, bare Momos (Blame) and painful Oizys (Misery) and the Hesperides who guard the rich, golden apples and the trees bearing fruit beyond glorious Ocean. Also she bore the Moirai (Destinies) and ruthless avenging Keres (Death Fates), Clotho and Lachesis and Atropos, who give men at their birth both evil and good to have, and they pursue the transgressions of men and of gods: and these goddesses never cease from their dread anger until they punish the sinner with a sore penalty. Also deadly Night bore Nemesis (Indignation) to afflict mortal men, and after her, Apate (Deceit) and Philotes (Friendship) and hateful Geras (Age) and hard-hearted Eris (Strife).

Hyginus's account 
From Nox/ Nyx (Night) and Erebus [were born]: Fatum/ Moros (Fate), Senectus/ Geras (Old Age), Mors/ Thanatos (Death), Letum (Dissolution), Continentia/ Sophrosyne (Moderation), Somnus/ Hypnos (Sleep), Somnia/ Oneiroi (Dreams), Amor (Love)--that is Lysimeles, Epiphron (Prudence), Porphyrion, Epaphus, Discordia/ Eris (Discord), Miseria/ Oizys (Misery), Petulantia/ Hybris (Wantonness), Nemesis (Envy), Euphrosyne (Good Cheer), Amicitia/Philotes (Friendship), Misericordia/ Eleos (Compassion), Styx (Hatred); the three Parcae/ Moirai (Fates), namely Clotho, Lachesis and Atropos; the Hesperides.

Cicero's account 
Their [Aether and Hemera's] brothers and sisters, whom the ancient genealogists name Amor/ Eros (Love), Dolus (Guile), Metus/ Deimos (Fear), Labor/ Ponus (Toil), Invidentia/ Nemesis (Envy), Fatum/ Moros (Fate), Senectus/ Geras (Old Age), Mors/ Thanatos (Death), Tenebrae/ Keres (Darkness), Miseria/ Oizys (Misery), Querella/ Momus (Complaint), Gratia]]/Philotes (Favour), Fraus/ Apate (Fraud), Pertinacia (Obstinacy), the Parcae/ Moirai (Fates), the Hesperides, the Somnia/ Oneiroi (Dreams): all of these are fabled to be the children of Erebus (Darkness) and Nox/ Nyx (Night).

Mythology 
According to Hesiod's Theogony, she represented sexual and social intercourse. Her siblings are said to be, among others, Apate (Deceit) and Nemesis (Indignation). She was described by Empedocles as one of the driving forces behind creation, being paired together with Neikea (Feuds); Philotes being the force behind good things and Neikea being the force of bad things. He also identifies her with Kypris and mentions that Philotes feels hurt and offended by life-destroying offerings and demands the abstention from animal sacrifices.

Notes

References 

 Gaius Julius Hyginus, Fabulae from The Myths of Hyginus translated and edited by Mary Grant. University of Kansas Publications in Humanistic Studies. Online version at the Topos Text Project.
 Hesiod, Theogony from The Homeric Hymns and Homerica with an English Translation by Hugh G. Evelyn-White, Cambridge, MA.,Harvard University Press; London, William Heinemann Ltd. 1914. Online version at the Perseus Digital Library. Greek text available from the same website.
 Marcus Tullius Cicero, Nature of the Gods from the Treatises of M.T. Cicero translated by Charles Duke Yonge (1812-1891), Bohn edition of 1878. Online version at the Topos Text Project.
 Marcus Tullius Cicero, De Natura Deorum. O. Plasberg. Leipzig. Teubner. 1917.  Latin text available at the Perseus Digital Library.

Love and lust goddesses
Greek love and lust deities
Greek goddesses
Personifications in Greek mythology
Children of Nyx
Daimons
Affection
Friendship
Mating